Håvard Tveite (5 March 1962 – 30 May 2021) was a Norwegian orienteering competitor.  He was Relay World Champion from 1987 and 1989, and has a silver medal from 1991 and a bronze medal from 1997. He also obtained bronze in the individual course at the 1989 World Orienteering Championships.

He was winner of the overall Orienteering World Cup in 1990, and placed third in the overall cup in 1988. He represented the sports clubs Ås IL and NTHI.

Tveite was also a regular contributor to the QGIS project, contributing to documentation and developing various plugins.

References

External links
 

1962 births
2021 deaths
People from Ås, Akershus
Norwegian orienteers
Male orienteers
Foot orienteers
World Orienteering Championships medalists
Sportspeople from Viken (county)